This article lists the winners and nominees for the Black Reel Award for Outstanding Independent Film. This award is presented to the directors of the film.

Winners and nominees
Winners are listed first and highlighted in bold.

2000s

2010s

2020s

Multiple nominations and wins

Multiple wins
 2 Wins
 Jordan Walker-Pearlman

Multiple nominations

 2 Nominations
 Jordan Walker-Pearlman
 Craig Ross Jr.

References

Black Reel Awards